TGJ may refer to:

 TGJ, the IATA code for Tiga Airport, Tiga Island, New Caledonia
 tgj, the ISO 639-3 code for Tagin language, India